Arthrobacter woluwensis is a species of Gram-positive bacteria. It has been implicated in some cases of subacute infective endocarditis.

References

Further reading
Sneath, Peter HA, et al. Bergey's manual of systematic bacteriology. Volume 5. Williams & Wilkins, 2012.

External links
LPSN
Type strain of Arthrobacter woluwensis at BacDive -  the Bacterial Diversity Metadatabase

Micrococcaceae
Psychrophiles
Bacteria described in 1997